Ruwe is a surname. Notable people with the surname include:
 Field Ruwe (born 1955), Zambian educator, historian, author and media practitioner
 Robert Ruwe (born 1941), American judge
 (born 1946), German military officer